Teodora Špirić (born 12 April 2000), known professionally as Teya (stylised in all caps) and formerly as Thea Devy, is an Austrian singer and songwriter. She is set to represent Austria in the Eurovision Song Contest 2023 alongside Salena with the song "Who the Hell Is Edgar?".

Biography 
Teodora Špirić was born on 12 April 2000 in Vienna, Austria to Serbian parents. She spent part of her childhood in Kladovo, Serbia, but later returned to Vienna with her family. She has cited Adele and Amy Winehouse as her main artistic influences.

In 2018, Špirić released her debut single "Waiting For". At the end of 2019, she applied to represent Austria in the Eurovision Song Contest 2020 with the song "Judgement Day". She was among the three shortlisted acts, but was not selected as the Austrian representative. The song had been translated into Serbian by Špirić's parents. On 9 January 2020, it was announced that she was selected to participate in the competition. She qualified for the final, where she finished in tenth place with 4 points.

In 2021, Špirić was a participant in the fifth season of the Austrian talent show Starmania. She made it to the top eight contestants, but was eliminated before the final. Later that year, she released the single "Runaway (Stay)" with Croatian singer Ninski, using the stage name Teya.

On 31 January 2023, it was announced that Špirić had been selected to represent Austria in the Eurovision Song Contest 2023 together with Salena, whom she met during her participation in Starmania. Their entry, named "Who the Hell Is Edgar?", was written at a songwriting camp in the Czech Republic and was released on 8 March 2023.

Discography

Singles 
 2018 – "Waiting For"
 2018 – "What Christmas Is About"
 2018 – "Collide"
 2020 – ""
 2021 – "Runaway (Stay)" 
 2022 – "Ex Me"
 2022 – "Mirror Mirror" 
 2022 – "Criminal" 
 2023 – "Who the Hell Is Edgar?"

References

External links 
 

2000 births
Living people
21st-century Austrian singers
Austrian people of Serbian descent
Austrian pop singers
Austrian singer-songwriters
English-language singers from Austria
Eurovision Song Contest entrants for Austria
Eurovision Song Contest entrants of 2023
People from Kladovo
People from Vienna
Serbian-language singers
Beovizija contestants
Starmania participants